Breckinridge is a surname, and may refer to:

 Aida de Acosta (1884–1962), in 1903 flew Santos Dumont's dirigible airship
 Cabell Breckinridge (1788–1823), lawyer and politician in Kentucky
 Clifton R. Breckinridge (1846–1932), congressman from Kentucky, Minister to Russia, son of John C. Breckinridge
 Desha Breckinridge (1867–1935), editor and publisher of the Lexington Herald, husband of Madeline McDowell Breckinridge and brother of Sophonisba Breckinridge
 Henry Skillman Breckinridge (1886–1960), lawyer, politician, and Olympic fencer
 James Breckinridge (1763–1833), Virginia lawyer and politician, Revolutionary War soldier and brigadier general in the War of 1812
 James Carson Breckinridge (1877–1942), United States Marine Corps officer
 James D. Breckinridge (died 1849), U.S. Representative from Kentucky
 John Breckinridge (U.S. Attorney General) (1760–1806), United States Senator and Attorney General
 John B. Breckinridge (1913–1979), Attorney General of Kentucky and member of the United States House of Representatives
 John C. Breckinridge (1821–1875), Senator from Kentucky, fourteenth Vice President of the United States, and later Confederate general and the last Confederate Secretary of War
 John Cabell Breckinridge, best known as Bunny Breckinridge, American actor
 Joseph Cabell Breckinridge Sr. (1842–1920), officer in the United States Navy in the Spanish–American War
 Madeline McDowell Breckinridge (1872–1920), Kentucky suffragette, reformer, and wife of Desha Breckinridge
 Mary Carson Breckinridge (1881–1965), founder of the Frontier Nursing Service
 Mary Cyrene Burch Breckinridge (1826–1907), wife of John C. Breckinridge and Second Lady of the United States
 Robert Jefferson Breckinridge (1800–1871), 1860 supporter of Lincoln over his nephew John C. Breckinridge
 Sophonisba Breckinridge (1866–1948), American activist
 William Campbell Preston Breckinridge (1837–1904), Confederate general and U.S. Representative from Kentucky
 William Robertson "Bill" Breckinridge (1907-1958), Major League pitcher, briefly, and longtime Tulsa attorney